"Someday We'll Be Together" is a song written by Johnny Bristol, Jackey Beavers, and Harvey Fuqua. It was the last of twelve American number-one pop singles for Diana Ross & the Supremes on the Motown label. Although it was released as the final Supremes song featuring Diana Ross, who left the group for a solo career in January 1970, it was recorded as Ross' first solo single and Supremes members Mary Wilson and Cindy Birdsong do not sing on the recording. Both appear on the B-side, "He's My Sunny Boy".

The single topped the Billboard Hot 100 pop singles chart for one week, in the final 1969 issue of Billboard magazine (dated December 27). It would be the last number one hit of the 1960s.

Background

Original version
The song was written by Johnny Bristol, Jackey Beavers, and Harvey Fuqua in 1961; Bristol and Beavers recorded the song together as "Johnny & Jackey" for the Tri-Phi label that same year. "Someday" was a moderate success in the Midwestern United States, but gained little notice in other venues.

Tri-Phi was purchased by Motown in the mid-1960s. Fuqua, Bristol, and Beavers all joined Berry Gordy's by-then famous record company, and "Someday We'll Be Together" became part of Motown's Jobete publishing catalog. Beavers soon departed for Chess Records, although both Bristol and Fuqua stayed on as songwriters and producers for the label.

Supremes version
In 1969, Bristol was preparing a new version of "Someday We'll Be Together", to be recorded by Motown act Jr. Walker & the All-Stars. Bristol had already recorded the instrumental track and the background vocals when Berry Gordy happened upon the tracks and heard them. Gordy thought that "Someday" would be a perfect first solo single for Diana Ross, who was making her long-expected exit from the Supremes at the time, and had Bristol sequester Ross into the studio to record the song.

Unable at first to get the vocal performance he desired from Diana Ross, Johnny Bristol decided to try something different: he would harmonize with Ross, helping her to get into the mood needed for the record. On the first take, the engineer accidentally recorded both Ross's vocal and Bristol's ad-libs. Bristol and arranger Wade Marcus liked the results, and Bristol had his vocal recorded alongside Ross' for the final version of the song. Bristol's ad-libs and words of encouragement to Ross can be heard in the background throughout the song. When Berry Gordy heard the completed song, he decided to release it as the final Diana Ross & the Supremes song.  Neither of the Supremes' remaining members, however, sang on the record.  Ross's first solo single instead, released in early 1970, became "Reach Out and Touch (Somebody's Hand)".

Even though the implicit subject of the song was that of Ross comforting a long-distance lover, "Someday We'll Be Together" allowed for other interpretations, one being that Ross and bandmates Mary Wilson and Cindy Birdsong would one day nostalgically "be together" again.  Further, in concert, Ross would suggest that "someday, we'll be together" in regard to contemporary troubles like civil rights and the ongoing demonstrations and protests against the Vietnam War.

Release
"Someday We'll Be Together" was included on the final Diana Ross & the Supremes album, Cream of the Crop (1969). The song was a United States number-one hit on both the Billboard Hot 100 popular singles chart and the R&B singles charts, as well as charting in the top twenty at number 13 on the UK Singles Chart. It also peaked on the Netherlands' MegaCharts at #19 in 1970. "Someday's" B-side, "He's My Sunny Boy", was recorded by Ross, Wilson, and Birdsong for the Love Child album in 1968 and written and produced by Smokey Robinson.

"Someday" charted at number-one on the Billboard Hot 100 popular singles chart for one week, on December 27, 1969. It also charted at number-one on the Billboard R&B Singles chart for four weeks, from December 13, 1969, to January 3, 1970. "Someday We'll Be Together" therefore appeared in Billboard as both the final Hot 100 and R&B number-one of the 1960s, and as the first R&B number-one of the 1970s.

Notable live performances
The girl group made their final of several performances throughout the decade with Diana Ross singing lead on the 1960s decennial finale of The Ed Sullivan Show that aired live Sunday, December 21, 1969, on CBS.

"Someday We'll Be Together" was the final number at Diana Ross & the Supremes' farewell concert on January 14, 1970, at the Frontier Hotel in Las Vegas. After the completion of the show, Jean Terrell was presented onstage to the audience as Diana Ross' replacement (alongside Wilson and Birdsong). Thus "Diana Ross & the Supremes" officially split apart, becoming "Diana Ross" (the solo act) and "The Supremes" (the group).

Ross reunited with Wilson and Birdsong in 1983, performing the single for the Motown 25: Yesterday, Today, Forever television special. However this performance was marred by lingering hostility between Ross and Wilson, which Motown insiders report resulted in Ross shoving Wilson out of her way during the on-stage performance. A heavily edited version of this performance was released on the DVD of Motown 25.

Other versions
 Bill Anderson and Jan Howard recorded a version for the country music market. Their version peaked at #4 on Billboard magazine'''s Hot Country Singles chart in the summer of 1970.
 Another version, credited to the "already-defunct" group (and fellow Motown act) The Marvelettes, was released in 1970 as well, as a track to the group's final album The Return of the Marvelettes. As with the Supremes version, lead vocalist Wanda Young Rogers was the only group member to sing on the track, with The Andantes used as backing vocalists.
 In 1994, Diana Ross released a remixed version by legendary DJ Frankie Knuckles. This single peaked at #7 on the Billboard Hot Dance Club Songs.
 Amber Riley sang the song in 2015 for Glees final episode "Dreams Come True".
 Bruce Springsteen recorded a cover version of the song for his 2022 album, Only the Strong Survive.
 Other versions include those by orchestra leader Bert Kaempfert (as a single in 1970), country singer Lorrie Morgan (as a single in 1983), Scottish pop singer Jimmy Somerville (on Dare to Love, 1995), and rock artist Vonda Shepard (on Heart and Soul: New Songs from Ally McBeal, 1999).

Personnel

Johnny & Jackey version
 Vocals by Johnny Bristol and Jackey Beavers 
 Instrumentation by various

Diana Ross & the Supremes version
 Lead vocals by Diana Ross
 Background vocals by Merry Clayton, Julia Waters, and Maxine Waters
 Male backing vocals by Johnny Bristol
 Instrumentation by the Funk Brothers and the Detroit Symphony Orchestra 
 Arranged by Wade Marcus

Bill Anderson and Jan Howard version
 Vocals by Bill Anderson and Jan Howard
 Instrumentation by various instrumentalists

The Marvelettes version
 Lead vocals by Wanda Young Rogers
 Background vocals by the Andantes: Jackie Hicks, Marlene Barrow, and Louvain Demps
 Instrumentation by the Funk Brothers and the Detroit Symphony Orchestra

Track listing

Supremes version7" single (14 October 1969)''' (North America/United Kingdom)
"Someday We'll Be Together" – 3:14
"He's My Sunny Boy" – 2:18

Chart history

Supremes version

Year-end charts

Certifications

See also 
 List of Hot 100 number-one singles of 1969 (U.S.)
 List of number-one R&B singles of 1969 (U.S.)
 List of number-one R&B singles of 1970 (U.S.)

Bibliography 
 Posner, Gerald (2002). Motown : Music, Money, Sex, and Power. New York: Random House. .
 Wilson, Mary and Romanowski, Patricia (1986, 1990, 2000). Dreamgirl & Supreme Faith: My Life as a Supreme. New York: Cooper Square Publishers. .
 Whitburn, Joel, "Top Country Songs: 1944-2005", 2006.

References

External links
 List of cover versions of "Someday We'll Be Together" at SecondHandSongs.com
 

1961 singles
1969 singles
1970 singles
Billboard Hot 100 number-one singles
Cashbox number-one singles
Doo-wop songs
The Supremes songs
Bill Anderson (singer) songs
Jan Howard songs
The Marvelettes songs
Songs written by Johnny Bristol
Songs written by Harvey Fuqua
Song recordings produced by Harvey Fuqua
Motown singles
Decca Records singles
1961 songs
Song recordings produced by Johnny Bristol
Song recordings produced by Owen Bradley